HTML5 File API aspect provides an API for representing file objects in web applications and programmatic selection and accessing their data. In addition, this specification defines objects to be used within threaded web applications for the synchronous reading of files. The File API describes how interactions with files are handled, for reading information about them and their data as well, to be able to upload it. Despite the name, the File API is not part of HTML5.

See also
File select
HTML5
W3C Geolocation API
Binary Large Object

References
 HTML5 File Writer API
 HTML5 File API
 Reading local files in JavaScript
 A state of limbo: the html5 file api, filereader, and blobs
 Geolocation API

External links
HTML5 Video Player

HTML5